Bagrat I may refer to:

 Bagrat I of Iberia, Prince in 830–876
 Bagrat I of Abkhazia, King in 887–898/899
 Bagrat I of Klarjeti (died in 900)
 Bagrat I of Tao (died March 945)
 Bagrat I of Imereti, the Minor, King in 1329–1330
 Bagrat I, Prince of Mukhrani, Prince in 1512–1539